All Time Greatest Hits is the first compilation by Brenda K. Starr. It spans releases by Starr from 1987–2000. It was released on May 4, 2002 by Platano Records and manufactured by America Disc USA. It features her Billboard Hot 100 hits, (excluding "No Matter What" feat. George Lamond), "Breakfast In Bed", "I Still Believe" and her award-winning song, "What You See Is What You Get." All Time Greatest Hits also includes her Spanish language hits such as "Herida", "Hombre Mio, Hombre Ajeno", "Petalos de Fuego" among others.

Track listings

Brenda K. Starr albums
2002 greatest hits albums